The 2015 Allsvenskan, part of the 2015 Swedish football season was the 91st season of Allsvenskan since its establishment in 1924. The 2015 fixtures were released on 21 January 2015. The season started on 4 April 2015, when BK Häcken visited newly promoted Hammarby IF at Tele2 Arena and ended on 31 October 2015. Malmö FF were the defending champions from the 2014 season.

A total of 16 teams contested the league; 14 returning from the 2014 season and two that were promoted from Superettan.

IFK Norrköping became champions on 31 October 2015, after a 2–0 defeat over defending champions Malmö FF in the last round. The win helped IFK Norrköping win the league with a margin of three points ahead of IFK Göteborg and five points clear of third-placed team AIK. By winning the league IFK Norrköping qualified for the second qualifying round of 2016–17 UEFA Champions League, while runners-up IFK Göteborg and third-placed AIK will be competing in first qualifying round of 2016–17 UEFA Europa League. The fourth-placed team Elfsborg will also play in Europa League if they or one of the top three teams win 2015–16 Svenska Cupen.

Summary

Background
The annual pre-season kick-off meeting is  held at Scandic Infra City in Upplands Väsby on 23 March 2015. Managers and key players from the major teams as well as some of the predicted bottom teams will be interviewed by representatives from the media as well as commentators from C More Entertainment, the official broadcasters of the league.

Season overview
The season started on 4 April 2015 with two fixtures, an early afternoon fixture between newcomers Hammarby IF and last year's fifth placed team BK Häcken at Tele2 Arena in Stockholm followed by the match between Kalmar FF and Helsingborgs IF at Guldfågeln Arena. The rest of the fixtures of the first round were spread out during the two following days. The defending champions Malmö FF will start the season with an away fixture against newcomers GIF Sundsvall at Norrporten Arena on 6 April 2015. The first few match weeks include a number of high-profile matches, Malmö FF faced last years third placed team AIK in a home fixture on 9 April 2015 and last year's runners-up IFK Göteborg in an away fixture on match day three on 12 April 2015. Matchday seven featured both a Scanian derby between Malmö FF and Helsingborg on 3 May 2015 and a Stockholm derby between AIK and Hammarby on 4 May 2015.

During the 26th round of play, a record was set as the total attendance for the season surpassed 2 million spectators. The previous record of 1,956,042 spectators was set in 1957–58.

Allsvenskans stora pris
For the third year running, the broadcaster of Allsvenskan, C More Entertainment, hosted an award ceremony where they presented seven awards and two special awards to the players and staff of the 16 Allsvenskan clubs, the award ceremony was held on 5 November 2015. The nominations for the 2015 season were officially announced on 2 November 2015. Nominees are displayed below, the winners are marked in bold text. IFK Norrköping received the most nominations with six nominations while AIK received five nominations and IFK Göteborg received four nominations. Djurgårdens IF and IF Elfsborg received two nominations and Falkenbergs FF and Malmö FF received one nomination each.

Goalkeeper of the year
John Alvbåge (IFK Göteborg)
Patrik Carlgren (AIK)
Kevin Stuhr Ellegaard (IF Elfsborg)

Defender of the year
Andreas Johansson (IFK Norrköping)
Haitam Aleesami (IFK Göteborg)
Emil Salomonsson (IFK Göteborg)

Midfielder of the year
Ebenezer Ofori (AIK)
Daniel Sjölund (IFK Norrköping)
Viktor Claesson (IF Elfsborg)

Forward of the year
Emir Kujović (IFK Norrköping)
Henok Goitom (AIK)
Markus Rosenberg (Malmö FF)

Newcomer of the year
Kerim Mrabti (Djurgårdens IF)
Sam Johnson (Djurgårdens IF)
Gustaf Nilsson (Falkenbergs FF)

Manager of the year
Jan Andersson (IFK Norrköping)
Jörgen Lennartsson (IFK Göteborg)
Andreas Alm (AIK)

Most valuable player of the year
Henok Goitom (AIK)
Emir Kujović (IFK Norrköping)
Andreas Johansson (IFK Norrköping)

Teams
A total of sixteen teams will contest the league, including fourteen sides from the 2014 season and two promoted teams from the 2014 Superettan. Both of the promoted teams for the 2014 season managed to stay in the league, Falkenbergs FF and Örebro SK.

Mjällby AIF and IF Brommapojkarna were relegated at the end of the 2014 season after finishing in the bottom two places of the table. They were replaced by 2014 Superettan champions Hammarby IF and runners-up GIF Sundsvall. Hammarby returned to Allsvenskan after five years absence, having been relegated at the end of the 2009 season. This was Hammarby's 47th season in the league. Sundsvall returned to Allsvenskan after two years absence, having been relegated at the end of the 2012 season. This was Sundsvall's 15th season in the league.

Gefle IF as 14th-placed team retained their Allsvenskan spot after winning against third-placed Superettan team Ljungskile SK 4–1 on aggregate in a relegation/promotion playoff.

Stadia and locations

 1 According to each club information page at the Swedish Football Association website for Allsvenskan.
 2 The capacity of Olympia will be reduced during the season due to major stadium renovations.

Personnel and kits

Note: Flags indicate national team as has been defined under FIFA eligibility rules. Players and Managers may hold more than one non-FIFA nationality.

 1 According to each club information page at the Swedish Football Association website for Allsvenskan.

Managerial changes

League table

Positions by round

Results

Play-offs 
The 14th-placed team of Allsvenskan meets the third-placed team from 2015 Superettan in a Two-legged tie on a home-and-away basis with the team from Allsvenskan finishing at home.

3–3 on aggregate. Falkenbergs FF won on away goals.

Season statistics

Top scorers

Top assists

Top goalkeepers
(Minimum of 10 games played)

Hat-tricks

Scoring
First goal of the season: Kennedy Bakircioglu for Hammarby IF against BK Häcken (4 April 2015)
Largest winning margin: 6 goals
IFK Göteborg 6–0 Örebro SK (2 August 2015)
Falkenbergs FF 6–0 Åtvidabergs FF (18 October 2015)
Highest scoring game: 7 goals
AIK 4–3 Falkenbergs FF (3 June 2015)
Malmö FF 4–3 Falkenbergs FF (23 September 2015)
BK Häcken 5–2 IF Elfsborg (25 October 2015)
Most goals scored in a match by a single team: 6 goals
IFK Göteborg 6–0 Örebro SK (2 August 2015)
Falkenbergs FF 6–0 Åtvidabergs FF (18 October 2015)
Most goals scored in a match by a losing team: 3 goals
AIK 4–3 Falkenbergs FF (3 June 2015)
Malmö FF 4–3 Falkenbergs FF (23 September 2015)
Fewest games failed to score in: 2
IFK Norrköping
Most games failed to score in: 14
Halmstads BK

Clean sheets
Most clean sheets: 14
IFK Göteborg
Fewest clean sheets: 4
GIF Sundsvall
Åtvidabergs FF
Örebro SK

Discipline
Most yellow cards (club): 62
Malmö FF
Most yellow cards (player): 9
Marcus Rohdén (IF Elfsborg)
Daniel Sjölund (IFK Norrköping)
Most red cards (club):  5
Åtvidabergs FF
Most red cards (player): 2
Daniel Hallingström (Åtvidabergs FF)
Most fouls (player): 71
Robin Simović (Helsingborgs IF)

See also

Competitions
 2015 Superettan
 2015 Division 1
 2014–15 Svenska Cupen
 2015–16 Svenska Cupen

Team seasons
 2015 AIK Fotboll season
 2015 BK Häcken season
 2015 Djurgårdens IF season
 2015 Hammarby Fotboll season
 2015 IFK Göteborg season
 2015 IFK Norrköping season
 2015 Malmö FF season

References

External links 

  

Allsvenskan seasons
Swed
Swed
1